Singin' to My Baby is the first album by Eddie Cochran, released on Liberty Records in mono in November 1957. The catalogue number was LRP 3061. It was the only album Eddie Cochran released during his short lifetime (which ended on April 17, 1960).

Content
The album contained the hit single "Sittin' in the Balcony" which rose to number 18 on the Billboard chart in 1957.

Track listing

1981 reissue
The album was re-issued by Liberty in 1981 as a ten-track album, omitting "I'm Alone Because I Love You" and "Have I Told You Lately That I Love You". The catalogue number was LN-10137.

Personnel
 Eddie Cochran – guitar, ukulele, vocals
 Perry Botkin Sr. – rhythm guitar
 Connie "Guybo" Smith – double bass
 The Johnny Mann Chorus – backing vocals

Chart performance

References

External links

Eddie Cochran US discography at Remember Eddie Cochran

Eddie Cochran albums
Liberty Records albums
1957 debut albums